The Batavier Line was a packet service between Rotterdam and London from 1830 until the 1960s. The line was established by the Nederlandsche Stoomboot Maatschappij (known as NSM and in English as Netherlands Steamship Company).

History

Having attempted unsuccessfully to establish services between Rotterdam–Hamburg and Antwerp–London, the company turned its attention to Rotterdam–London  and became the first regular foreign-owned company to set up such a service into London Port. 

The original boat on the service was the wooden paddle steamer De Batavier (built 1829). She was replaced by an iron-hulled paddle steamer named Batavier in 1855, and this ship was replaced by another iron-hulled steamer  in 1872.

In 1895, NSM sold the company to Wm. H. Müller and Co. and  a condition of sale  was that the Batavier name would be maintained as the company name and the naming scheme for its ships.

When this pair joined the fleet, the prior Batavier was renamed Batavier I. In Rotterdam, the ships docked at the Willemsplein; in London, the ships originally docked near London Bridge, but in 1899 switched to Custom House and Wool Quays near Tower Bridge (now known as Sugar Quay). Also beginning in 1899, the Batavier Line service between Rotterdam and London was offered daily except Sundays. In 1909 Batavier II and Batavier III were rebuilt to a size more closely aligned with the later ships.

During the early stages of World War I, the line continued service, but the ships were sometime subjected to being stopped by German submarines. In March 1915, Batavier V was stopped and seized as a prize by German submarine , but later released by the German prize court. In May 1916, Batavier V struck a mine off the British coast and was sunk with the loss of four lives.

In June 1922 the London terminal was changed to "Batavier Pier" in Gravesend.

A newer Batavier III, added in 1939 to replace the 1902 ship of the same name, was also seized by the Germans and later mined. After the end of the war, only the 1921 Batavier II remained in service for the line and continued passenger service until April 1958 ending the 128 year service. Several freighters were added in the late 1950s and a freight service was continued for a time after passenger service ended.

Ships
See list of ships operated below

References

Bibliography 
  
 

Companies established in 1830
Defunct shipping companies of the Netherlands
1830 establishments in the Netherlands
Defunct transport companies of the Netherlands